Coup de glotte or 'shock of the glottis' is a term used in the theory of singing technique to describe a particular method of emitting or opening a note by an abrupt physical mechanism of the glottis (the space between the vocal folds). During the 19th century there was disagreement among teachers and performers as to whether the technique should be taught as a normal part of vocal method or not. The technique is still sometimes used to achieve particular effects, dramatic or ornamental, but is usually avoided in the teaching of fundamental vocal method. In English, it is often called a glottal attack.

Tone production and vocal 'attack' 
Vocal sound is produced by a column of air passing from the lungs through the larynx while the vocal cords or ligaments are drawn together, leaving narrow spaces through which the air passes in short, rapid pulsations or vibrations. The discipline of training aims to remove all rigidity and strain in the throat while governing the maximum economy of the ratio of breath to tone produced, so that a relaxed and pure tone may float freely on the breath, supported by the trained and elastic pressure of the diaphragm upon the lungs.

When singing a note, it is desirable that the release of breath and the attack of the tone should occur simultaneously and without artifice. When beginning on a vowel, with no added consonant to mask the start of the note, one can hear if there is any undesirable emission of breath or aspirate (Ha) before the production of tone. If the voice is correctly produced the union of tone and breath should be spontaneous, but if it is not, this fault will apply to every note produced even when the effect is masked by a consonant, and will form a basic (and vocally destructive) flaw in the vocal method.

Advocacy of 'coup de glotte' 
The 'coup de glotte' was taught by the very famous teacher Manuel García as the means of achieving this in normal singing method. García had invented or implemented the laryngoscope, and sought to present scientific explanations for certain functions. He expressed it as follows:
'The pupil... should draw in breath slowly, and then produce the sounds by a neat, resolute articulation of the glottis, upon the broad Italian vowel A. If this movement be properly executed, the sound will come out bright and round. Care however must be taken to pitch the sound at once on the note itself, and not to slur up to it, or feel for it. The pupil must also be warned against confounding the articulation or stroke of the glottis with the stroke of the chest, which latter resembles the act of coughing, or the effort made in expelling some obstruction from the throat...
The glottis is prepared for articulation by closing it, which causes a momentary accumulation of air below; and it is then opened by a sudden and vigorous stroke, similar to the action of the lips when strongly emphasising the letter P. Some masters recommend the use of [consonants, e.g. Pa, La] in order to acquire precision in striking notes; but in our opinion this plan... has the disadvantage of merely disguising the faulty articulation of the glottis, without possessing any power whatever of correcting it.' Garcia, A Compendious Treatise, Part 1 Chap. 6, section on Articulation of the Glottis.

Criticism 
Much of García's 'method' remains extremely important as a plan for the correct development and production of the voice. But in this respect his 'scientific' approach misfired, and resulted in many students and singers attempting to reproduce the effect described by conscious muscular movement in the throat. This often had injurious results. An essential basis of expressive singing is that the breath and tone should be united without any conscious adjustment of the vocal mechanism, through teaching-methods which direct the singer's attention away from the muscular apparatus by which the sound is produced.

The technique (of 'some masters') referred to by García of vocal exercising rapidly repeating plosive syllables such as 'Pa', transfers the momentary restraint of breath from the larynx or glottis to the lips, so that the natural diaphragmatic attack, without glottal manipulation, is learned. The use of soft vocalised syllables such as 'Ma' or 'Na', in rapid succession on single notes or in vocalises, assist in directing the tone to its 'forward' focus of resonance as the tone remains continuously engaged while the lips of the mouth are intermittently closed and opened and the nasal passages remain unobstructed.

The criticism of the method is expressed, for instance, by Mme Tetrazzini: In the result the "attack" is certainly very sharp and clean, but personally I cannot recommend this particular method of achieving that result, since the effect is anything but agreeable to the ear, and there is good reason for thinking that the practice, besides being unnecessary, is also injurious to a vocal organ... There should never be any strain or forcing of any kind, and on the same principle is the rule as to the amount of breath emitted, which should always be the smallest quantity possible which suffices to produce the tone required. (How to Sing, 1923, Chap. 14, Vocal Cords.)

A historical debate 
A very resounding condemnation of the coup de glotte as a singing technique was given by Victor Maurel, in a public lecture at the Lyceum Theatre in July 1892. The debate at that time was strong, and is reported lucidly in several phrases by George Bernard Shaw. The technique was then being advocated by the teacher Charles Lunn (who trained the baritone Frederic Austin) and to an even greater extent by Dr J.W. Bernhardt, in lectures and pamphlets or books on singing method. Shaw noticed the tendency of the technique to produce coarseness in the middle register, and attributed the fault to the García method, and to the teaching of the Royal Academy of Music.

In 1892-93 Shaw and Lunn clashed publicly over the impact of the technique on such singers as Thérèse Tietjens, Mathilde Marchesi, Nellie Melba and Charles Santley. Lunn claimed that the attack on a vowel was impossible without the coup de glotte: Shaw used the example of the organ pipe, or of whistling, to assert the opposite. In the cases of Melba and Santley, at least, the living example left no doubt that this was not an integral part of their vocal method.

References and further reading 
Manuel Garcia (II), New Compendious Treatise on The Art of Singing (2 Parts) (?London, c1870s printing).
J. Gardiner, A Guide to Good Singing and Speech (Cassell, London 1968) - Appendix.
L. Manen, Bel Canto: The Teaching of the Classical Italian Song-Schools, Its Decline and Restoration (Oxford University Press, 1987).
H. Rosenthal and J. Warrack, The Concise Oxford Dictionary of Opera (London, 1974 printing).
M. Scott, The Record of Singing to 1914 (Duckworth, London 1977), at p. 20.
G.B. Shaw, Music in London 1890-1894 (Vol II), (Constable, London 1932).
Luisa Tetrazzini, How to Sing (Arthur Pearson, London 1923).
James Stark, "Bel Canto" (University of Toronto Press Inc. 1999)
 Richard Miller, "The Structure of Singing" (Schirmer Books, Macmillan. Inc. 1986)

Opera terminology